Welcome to the Waks Family is a 2003 Australian documentary film exploring the life of a Chabad Hasidic family in Melbourne. The film follows the life of Zephaniah and Haya Waks and their 17 children. Zephaniah was born Stephen Waks and lived as a secular Jew in Sydney, Australia, before joining the Chabad Hasidic community. The documentary was directed by filmmaker Barbara Chobocky who was a friend of Zephania while they both studied at university. The film was screened on the SBS television channel.

See also 
 Chabad in film and television

References 

Films about Orthodox and Hasidic Jews
Films about Chabad